Brian Sipotz (born September 16, 1981) is a retired American professional ice hockey player.  He played collegiate hockey at Miami University, and retired after the 2010-11 season with SG Cortina of the Italian Hockey League.

Collegiate career 

Sipotz played junior hockey for Culver Military Academy before signing to play US college hockey for the Miami RedHawks  of the Central Collegiate Hockey Association (CCHA).  Sipotz was  selected by the Atlanta Thrashers in the 4th round (100th overall) of the 2001 NHL Entry Draft after his freshman season.  Sipotz played an integral defensive role for Miami, tallying 5 assists and 139 penalty minutes in his career, which culminated in his senior season with the program's third ever trip to the NCAA Tournament in 2004.  Miami lost to eventual national champion Denver in the West Regional 3-2, with Sipotz being assessed a pivotal 3-period major and game misconduct for a check from behind on Pioneer Jon Foster.

Professional career 

Brian played 7 years of professional hockey, including 6 years with the Chicago Wolves, the American Hockey League affiliate of Atlanta. In that time, he was the spokesman for the Wolves’ Adopt-A-Dog program, a two time Chicago Sports Profile Hometown Hero award winner, and the American Hockey League Man of the Year finalist. Brian was also a league leader in plus/minus in 2006-07, and made two AHL championship Calder Cup finals appearances, including a Calder Cup championship campaign in 2008 with Chicago.  He finished his professional career in 2010-11 with SG Cortina in Italy.

Personal life 

Sipotz, with a degree in exercise physiology from Miami University is now a coach in Ann Arbor, Michigan for Hockey University and Advantage Personal Training.  He resides in Milan, Michigan with his wife and family.

Career statistics

References

External links

Living people
Atlanta Thrashers draft picks
Chicago Wolves players
Gwinnett Gladiators players
Miami RedHawks men's ice hockey players
SG Cortina players
1981 births
Ice hockey players from Indiana
Ice hockey coaches from Indiana
American men's ice hockey defensemen